Alfredo Javier Rodríguez Dávila (born 12 August 1969) is a Mexican politician from the National Action Party. From 2009 to 2012 he served as Deputy of the LXI Legislature of the Mexican Congress representing Nuevo León.

References

1951 births
Living people
Politicians from Monterrey
National Action Party (Mexico) politicians
21st-century Mexican politicians
Deputies of the LXI Legislature of Mexico
Members of the Chamber of Deputies (Mexico) for Nuevo León